The Rat Defense, English Rat is an irregular Queen's Pawn Game chess opening characterised by the initial moves:
1. d4 d6
2. c4 e5

The position can also arise from an English Opening move order 1.c4 d6 2.d4 e5.

Another possible move order can be reached via the Englund Gambit: 1. d4 e5 2. c4 d6.

The "English Rat" has been played by top players such as Aronian, Anand, Svidler, Rapport, and Smirin.

Gambit lines 
 Lisbon Gambit: 1.d4 d6 2.c4 e5 3. dxe5 Nc6, which usually continues 4. exd6 Bxd6 or (4...Qxd6).
 Pounds Gambit: 1. d4 d6 2. c4 e5 3. dxe5 Be6

See also
 List of chess openings
Related openings:
 Wade Defence
 Pirc Defence
 Modern Defence
 Englund Gambit

References

Bibliography
 

Chess openings